Arachis archeri (Portuguese common name: amendoim do campo limpo) is a herb native to Mato Grosso vegetation in Brazil. This plant is cited as gene sources for research in plant biology of peanut (Arachis hypogaea).

External links

archeri
Flora of Brazil